Waterford Township, Iowa may refer to:

 Waterford Township, Clay County, Iowa
 Waterford Township, Clinton County, Iowa

See also 
Waterford Township (disambiguation)

Iowa township disambiguation pages